

Tournament 

Kisei (Go)
1992 in go